Sky Sports Radio (formerly 2KY) is a commercial radio station based in Sydney, broadcasting throughout New South Wales and Canberra on a network of over 140 narrowcast transmitters as well as the main 1017 AM frequency in Sydney. It broadcasts live commentary of thoroughbred, harness and greyhound racing. Over 1,500 races are covered each week, including the pre and post race form and TAB betting information.

History

Sky Sports Radio was founded by Emil Voigt as 2KY under the ownership of the Labor Council of New South Wales with the aim of broadcasting 'musical entertainment, news, weather, market reports, public debates and matters of educational value'. Night broadcasts of trotting began in 1949 with greyhound racing following soon after. In the 1960s the station took over thoroughbred racing commentary from 2GB. By the mid-1970s Saturday afternoon racing broadcasts had started.

In 1992 the station started establishing a statewide network of narrowcast relay transmitters. 2KY was one of the pioneering stations of Digital Audio Broadcasting in Australia. In 2001 2KY was acquired by Sky Racing and in 2009, rebranded as Sky Sports Radio. Its studios moved from Parramatta to Frenchs Forest in 2015.

In 2005, 2KY closed its newsroom, in favour of taking a feed from Broadcast Operations Group. In March 2006 it was taken over by Macquarie Media.

Programming

National Racing Service
The National Racing Service features every TAB meeting throughout Australia, as well as coverage of race meetings in New Zealand and Hong Kong and to a lesser extent the United Kingdom and United States. Although racing is the main-stay on 2KY other sports are featured. The Big Sports Breakfast features a range of national and international sports each weekday morning.

Big Sports Breakfast
The Big Sports Breakfast is presented by Michael Clarke and Laurie Daley. Previous hosts have included Richard Freedman, Terry Kennedy and Michael Slater.

Notable presenters

Current
Michael Clarke
Laurie Daley

Former
Notable former presenters have included

References

External links
Official website

Radio stations in Sydney
Radio stations in Newcastle, New South Wales
Radio stations in Wagga Wagga
Radio stations in New South Wales
Radio stations in Canberra
Radio stations established in 1925
Sports radio stations in Australia
1925 establishments in Australia